The BICh-5  was a tailless bomber aircraft designed in the USSR from  1928.

Development 
After the relative success of Chyeranovskii's first tailless gliders and powered aircraft, the BICh-1 and BICh-2 and BICh-3, he continued the tailless theme with the BICh-5 bomber. The BICh-5 was to have been a twin-engined tailless aircraft with a retractable undercarriage, two BMW VI engines and multi segment convex elevons suspended below the trailing edge of the wing. Wind tunnel testing was carried out with a model during 1928 but further work was abandoned in 1929.

See also

References

 Gunston, Bill. “The Osprey Encyclopaedia of Russian Aircraft 1875 – 1995”. London, Osprey. 1995. 

1920s Soviet and Russian bomber aircraft
Chyeranovskii aircraft